Daniel Craycraft House is a historic home located at Noblesville, Hamilton County, Indiana.  It was built in 1892, and is a large -story, Queen Anne style frame dwelling.  It features a three-story, square corner tower; cross-gables; steep gable-on-hip roof; porches and balconies; and contrasting textures and materials.

It was listed on the National Register of Historic Places in 1989.  It is located in the Conner Street Historic District.

References

Houses on the National Register of Historic Places in Indiana
Queen Anne architecture in Indiana
Houses completed in 1892
Buildings and structures in Hamilton County, Indiana
National Register of Historic Places in Hamilton County, Indiana
Historic district contributing properties in Indiana
1892 establishments in Indiana